The following squads and players competed in the women's handball tournament at the 1992 Summer Olympics.

Austria
The following players represented Austria:

 Barbara Strass
 Edith Matei
 Iris Morhammer
 Jasna Kolar-Merdan
 Jadranka Jez
 Karin Prokop
 Kerstin Jönßon
 Liliana Topea
 Marianna Racz
 Nataliya Rusnachenko
 Nicole Peissl
 Stanka Bozovic
 Slavica Djukić
 Teresa Zurowski

Germany
The following players represented Germany:

 Andrea Bölk
 Andrea Stolletz
 Anja Krüger
 Bianca Urbanke
 Birgit Wagner
 Carola Ciszewski
 Eike Bram
 Elena Leonte
 Gabriele Palme
 Kerstin Mühlner
 Michaela Erler
 Rita Köster
 Sabine Adamik
 Silke Fittinger
 Silvia Schmitt
 Sybille Gruner

Nigeria
The following players represented Nigeria:

 Agustina Nkechi Abi
 Angela Ajodo
 Barbara Diribe
 Bridget Yamala Egwolosan
 Chiaka Lauretta Ihebom
 Eunice Idausa
 Immaculate Nwaogu
 Justina Akpulo
 Justina Anyiam
 Mary Ihedioha
 Mary Nwachukwu
 Mary Soronadi
 Ngozi Opara
 Auta Olivia Sana
 Uzoma Azuka
 Victoria Umunna

Norway
The following players represented Norway:

 Hege Kirsti Frøseth
 Tonje Sagstuen
 Hanne Hogness
 Heidi Sundal
 Susann Goksør
 Cathrine Svendsen
 Mona Dahle
 Siri Eftedal
 Henriette Henriksen
 Ingrid Steen
 Karin Pettersen
 Annette Skotvoll
 Kristine Duvholt
 Heidi Tjugum

South Korea
The following players represented South Korea:

 Cha Jae-Kyung
 Han Hyun-Sook
 Han Sun-Hee
 Hong Jeong-ho
 Jang Ri-Ra
 Kim Hwa-Sook
 Lee Ho-Youn
 Lee Mi-Young
 Lim O-Kyeong
 Min Hye-Sook
 Moon Hyang-Ja
 Nam Eun-Young
 Oh Sung-Ok
 Park Jeong-Lim
 Park Kap-Sook

Spain
The following players represented Spain:

 Amaia Ugartamendía
 Blanca Martín-Calero
 Cristina Gómez
 Dolores Ruiz
 Esperanza Tercero
 Karmele Makazaga
 Eugenia Sánchez
 Mercedes Fuertes
 Montserrat Marin
 Montse Puche
 Paloma Arranz
 Raquel Vizcaíno
 Rita Hernández
 Begoña Sánchez

Unified Team
The following players represented the Unified Team:

 Natalya Anisimova
 Maryna Bazhanova
 Svetlana Bogdanova
 Galina Borzenkova
 Natalya Deryugina
 Tatyana Dzhandzhgava
 Lyudmila Gudz
 Elina Guseva
 Tetyana Horb
 Larisa Kiselyova
 Natalya Morskova
 Galina Onopriyenko
 Svetlana Pryakhina

United States
The following players represented the United States:

 Sharon Cain
 Kim Clarke
 Laura Coenen
 Laurie Fellner
 Sam Jones
 Portia Lack
 Dannette Leininger
 Pat Neder
 Karyn Palgut
 Carol Peterka
 Angie Raynor
 Barbara Schaaf
 Cindy Stinger

References

1992
1992 in women's handball